Coal Mines Historic Site was, for a period of 15 years (1833–48), a convict probation station and the site of Tasmania's (then Van Diemen's Land's) first operational coal mine, "serving as a place of punishment for the 'worst class' of convicts from Port Arthur".

It is now the site of a collection of ruins and landscape modifications located amongst bushland facing onto the Tasman Peninsula's Little Norfolk Bay, being ruins and landscape modifications of such cultural significance to Australia and to the World that the site has been formally inscribed onto both the Australian National Heritage List and UNESCO's World Heritage list as amongst:

" .. the best surviving examples of large-scale convict transportation and the colonial expansion of European powers through the presence and labour of convicts."

See also
 Australian Convict Sites

External links
 
 Coal Mines Historic Site website
 Tasmania Parks and Wildlife Service - Coal Mines Historic Site

References

World Heritage Sites in Australia
Australian National Heritage List
 
Defunct prisons in Tasmania
Protected areas of Tasmania
1833 establishments in Australia
Tasman Peninsula
Tasmanian Heritage Register
Convictism in Tasmania